Rogerio Cannellini also known as Rogerinho (born 7 March 1979) is a both Brazilian and Italian footballer playing as an attacking midfielder.

Career
Rogerinho previously played in the Copa do Brasil for Sampaio Corrêa Futebol Clube. He signed with RCD Mallorca, but only made appearances with the club's reserve team. In December 2003, Mallorca loaned Rogerinho to CD Tenerife where he would make three Segunda División appearances.

Rogerinho joined Skoda Xanthi F.C. in 2005. He was loaned to Alexandroupoli Enosi and Kastoria F.C. during his time with Skoda Xanthi.

References

1979 births
Living people
Brazilian footballers
Brazilian people of Italian descent
Sampaio Corrêa Futebol Clube players
RCD Mallorca B players
CD Tenerife players
Xanthi F.C. players
Kastoria F.C. players
Association football midfielders
Sportspeople from Campinas